Eric Lawson (born February 12, 1981) is an American mixed martial artist, who is perhaps best known for his fight stint with now-defunct promotion Strikeforce. A professional mixed martial arts since 2004, Lawson holds a record of 9–5.

Mixed martial arts career
Lawson made his professional mixed martial arts debut on February 12, 2004, when he defeated Brandon Gallo via rear-naked choke submission at Gladiator Challenge 22. Following this, Lawson would compile a record of 3–1 before making his first appearance for now-defunct promotion Strikeforce.

Strikeforce
In his first appearance in the promotion, Lawson faced Josh Neal at Strikeforce: Four Men Enter, One Man Survives on November 16, 2007. He won the fight via rear-naked choke submission. After compiling a 1–1 record outside Strikeforce, Lawson signed a new contract with the promotion, and faced Jesse Gillespie at Strikeforce: Melendez vs. Thomson on June 27, 2008. He won the fight via rear-naked choke.

He then faced Kenneth Seegrist at Strikeforce: At The Mansion II on September 20, 2008, winning the fight via rear-naked choke, his third straight rear-naked choke submission in the organization.

Lawson faced Tony Johnson at Strikeforce: Destruction on November 21, 2008. He won the fight via rear-naked choke, moving to 4–0 inside the promotion.

For his fifth fight inside Strikeforce, Lawson faced Waylon Kennell at Strikeforce: Shamrock vs. Diaz on April 11, 2009. He won the fight via first-round TKO.

Lawson faced Wayne Phillips at Strikeforce Challengers: Kaufman vs. Hashi on February 26, 2010. He lost the fight via armbar submission. He then faced Ron Keslar at Strikeforce: Diaz vs. Cyborg on January 29, 2011. He lost the fight via armbar, and was subsequently released from the promotion.

Post-Strikeforce Career
After being released from Strikeforce in late 2011, Lawson faced Mauricio Alonso at Dragon House 8 on November 18, 2011. He lost the fight via triangle choke.

Mixed martial arts record

|-
| Loss
| align=center| 9–5
| Mauricio Alonso
| Submission (triangle choke)
| DH: Dragon's House 8
| 
| align=center| 2
| align=center| 1:38
| San Francisco, California, United States
| 
|-
| Loss
| align=center| 9–4
| Ron Keslar
| Submission (armbar)
| Strikeforce: Diaz vs. Cyborg
| 
| align=center| 1
| align=center| 1:57
| San Jose, California, United States
| 
|-
| Loss
| align=center| 9–3
| Wayne Philips
| Submission (armbar)
| Strikeforce Challengers: Kaufman vs. Hashi
| 
| align=center| 1
| align=center| 4:47
| San Jose, California, United States
| 
|-
| Win
| align=center| 9–2
| Waylon Kennell
| TKO (punches)
| Strikeforce: Shamrock vs. Diaz
| 
| align=center| 1
| align=center| 4:54
| San Jose, California, United States
| 
|-
| Win
| align=center| 8–2
| Tony Johnson
| Submission (rear-naked choke)
| Strikeforce: Destruction
| 
| align=center| 1
| align=center| 1:28
| San Jose, California, United States
| 
|-
| Win
| align=center| 7–2
| Kenneth Seegrist
| Submission (rear-naked choke)
| Strikeforce: At The Mansion II
| 
| align=center| 1
| align=center| 3:07
| Beverly Hills, California, United States
| 
|-
| Win
| align=center| 6–2
| Jesse Gillespie
| Submission (rear-naked choke)
| Strikeforce: Melendez vs. Thomson
| 
| align=center| 1
| align=center| 1:03
| San Jose, California, United States
| 
|-
| Win
| align=center| 5–2
| Marcus Gaines
| Decision (unanimous)
| GC 75: Erin-Go-BRAWL
| 
| align=center| 3
| align=center| 5:00
| San Francisco, California, United States
| 
|-
| Loss
| align=center| 4–2
| Raul Castillo
| TKO (punches)
| GC 7: Seasons Beatings
| 
| align=center| 2
| align=center| 2:23
| San Francisco, California, United States
| 
|-
| Win
| align=center| 4–1
| Josh Neal
| Submission (rear-naked choke)
| Strikeforce: Four Men Enter, One Man Survives
| 
| align=center| 2
| align=center| 0:20
| San Jose, California, United States
| 
|-
| Win
| align=center| 3–1
| Chris Werner
| KO (punches)
| GC 66: Battle Ground
| 
| align=center| 1
| align=center| N/A
| San Francisco, California, United States
| 
|-
| Loss
| align=center| 2–1
| Nik Theotikos
| Submission (triangle choke)
| GC 61: Chaos at Kezar
| 
| align=center| 2
| align=center| 2:46
| San Francisco, California, United States
| 
|-
| Win
| align=center| 2–0
| Attila Bordor
| Decision
| GC 36: Proving Grounds
| 
| align=center| 2
| align=center| 5:00
| San Francisco, California, United States
| 
|-
| Win
| align=center| 1–0
| Brandon Gallo
| Submission (rear-naked choke)
| GC 22: Gladiator Challenge 22
| 
| align=center| 2
| align=center| 1:00
| San Francisco, California, United States
|

References

External links

Strikeforce Homepage

1981 births
Living people
American male mixed martial artists
Mixed martial artists from California
Middleweight mixed martial artists